Ned Kelly (sometimes titled Ned Kelly: The Electric Music Show) is an Australian musical with book and lyrics by Reg Livermore and music by Patrick Flynn.  It tells the story of Australian bushranger Ned Kelly with an eclectic score combining rock opera, vaudeville and burlesque. The original Australian production played in Adelaide and Sydney in 1977 and 1978.

Development and concept album
Livermore began writing Ned Kelly in 1972 when touring as a performer with the musical Hair in Perth and Adelaide. Livermore and Flynn had previously collaborated on the musical Lasseter which was produced in Sydney in 1971 by the Old Tote Theatre Company at the Parade Theatre.

In the manner of Jesus Christ Superstar, a concept album of the musical was made prior to a stage production.  The concept album, released in mid-1974, featured various members of the Australian cast of Jesus Christ Superstar, including Jon English as Ned Kelly, Trevor White, John Paul Young and Livermore. Janice Slater sang the role of Ma Kelly.

Creation of the album involved some disharmony between Ned Kelly'''s collaborators, with Bob Ellis brought in by producer Clyde Packer and Flynn to revise existing lyrics and write lyrics for new songs (he is credited on the album as additional lyrics).

Side A
 "What Else Is New?"	
 "Put 'Em Down"	
 "Lullaby"	
 "Rob a Bank	"
 "Never Going Home"

Side B	
 "Better Watch Yerself"
 "Dark Walk Home"	
 "Queen Victoria's Fuzz"
 "If I Was King"	
 "Die Like a Kelly"	
 "Band Together"	
 "Finale"

Charts

Productions

In 1974, it was announced that Robert Helpmann would direct a production in 1975 to feature Livermore, Jon English and Jeannie Lewis, produced by Packer in partnership with J.C. Williamson's. This production did not eventuate.

In mid-1977, the Adelaide Festival Centre Trust started planning for the first production of Ned Kelly, to open in Adelaide.  Livermore was director and designer, with Keith Bain the choreographer and Michael Carlos musical director.  The cast included Nick Turbin as Ned Kelly, Geraldine Turner as Ma Kelly, Doug Parkinson as Joe Byrne and Arthur Dignam as Superintendent Hare.Ned Kelly opened 30 December 1977 at the Festival Theatre, Adelaide Festival Centre.  It was produced by the Adelaide Festival Centre Trust, Eric Dare, the Australian Elizabethan Theatre Trust and SAS Channel 10. The musical was capitalised at $250,000 with weekly running costs of $40,000 to $50,000.  The production was visually striking, with design features including a full drop curtain containing over 600 hurricane lamps and Kelly's iconic armour represented by a costume of shiny black plastic with geometric bullet holes. Critical reception was negative.  The major Adelaide newspaper, the Adelaide Advertiser, in its review referred to the show as "an artistic disaster – a hideous monument to bad taste and theatrical excess".

The production transferred to Her Majesty's Theatre in Sydney on 4 February 1978, where critical reception was substantially more positive. After two months, the production closed in Sydney.  An expected Melbourne season at the Palais Theatre from early April 1978 did not occur.

The only professional revival has been a production by the New Moon Theatre Company, directed by Terence O'Connell, that toured the Queensland regional cities of Cairns, Townsville, Mackay and Rockhampton in January and February 1982.

 Recordings 
Original cast member Geraldine Turner performed the ballad "Die Like a Kelly" in a 1994 ABC television special on Australian musicals (Once in a Blue Moon'') and this song is featured on its soundtrack.

References

External links

Ned Kelly at David Spicer Productions (performance rights)
"Die Like a Kelly" from Ned Kelly performed by Geraldine Turner on YouTube

1977 musicals
Australian musicals
Biographical musicals
Biographical plays about criminals
Cultural depictions of Ned Kelly
Plays set in Australia
Plays set in the 19th century